Progress M1-6, identified by NASA as Progress 4P, was a Progress spacecraft used to resupply the International Space Station. It was a Progress-M1 11F615A55 spacecraft, with the serial number 255.

Launch
Progress M1-6 was launched on the maiden flight of the Soyuz-FG carrier rocket, flying from Site 1/5 at the Baikonur Cosmodrome. Launch occurred at 22:32:40 UTC on 20 May 2001. The spacecraft docked with the aft port of the Zvezda module at 00:23:57 UTC on 23 May 2001.

Undocking
It remained docked for 91 days before undocking at 06:02 UTC on 22 August 2001 to make way for Progress M-45. It was deorbited at 09:00 UTC on the same day, burning up in the atmosphere over the Pacific Ocean, with any remaining debris landing in the ocean at around 09:50 UTC.

Progress M1-6 carried supplies to the International Space Station, including food, water and oxygen for the crew and equipment for conducting scientific research.

See also

 List of Progress flights
 Uncrewed spaceflights to the International Space Station

References

Progress (spacecraft) missions
Supply vehicles for the International Space Station
Spacecraft launched in 2001
Spacecraft which reentered in 2001
Spacecraft launched by Soyuz-FG rockets